The Tipperary Cup is a greyhound racing competition held annually at Thurles Greyhound Stadium, Thurles, County Tipperary, Ireland.  

It was inaugurated in 1957  and is an integral part of the Irish greyhound racing calendar.

Past winners

Venues and distances
1957–1984 (Thurles 525y)
1985–1999 (Thurles 550y)
2000–2000 (Thurles 525y)
2001–2002 (Thurles 550y)
2003–present (Thurles 525y)

Sponsors
 2006–2006 (F.F.K.Sires & Euro Spar)
 2007–2007 (G Sports & Thurles Fresh Milk)
 2008–2019 (Thurles Fresh Milk)
 2020–present (Centenary Agri)

References

Greyhound racing competitions in Ireland
Sport in Thurles
Sport in County Tipperary
Recurring sporting events established in 1963